Dichrostachys cinerea, known as sicklebush, Bell mimosa, Chinese lantern tree or Kalahari Christmas tree (South Africa), is a legume of the genus Dichrostachys in the family Fabaceae.

Other common names include omubambanjobe (Tooro Uganda), acacia Saint Domingue (French), el marabú (Cuba), " Mpangara" (Shona), Kalahari-Weihnachtsbaum (German of former South West Africa), kéké or mimosa clochette (Réunion).

Etymology
The generic name Dichrostachys means 'two-colored spike', referring to its two-colored inflorescence, from the Ancient Greek δί- (di-, 'twice'), χροός (khroos, 'color'), and στάχυς (stakhus, 'ear of grain'). The specific name cinerea refers to the greyish hairs of the typical subspecies, from the Latin cinereus ('ashes').

Distribution
It is native to Africa, Indian subcontinent and North Australia and introduced to the Caribbean and parts of Southeast Asia. In Ethiopia, the species is common in the Nechisar National Park.

The tree was brought to the Caribbean in the 19th century. Plans are underway to exploit it as a source of biomass for renewable power generation.

This tree is appearing in peninsular Florida. It is as yet uncertain if it was introduced by humans or birds.

Description and ecology

Upper flowers of a hanging spike are sterile, and are of a lilac or pale purple. The species can be subcategorized with two slight variations that have been recognised: D. cinerea ssp. africana and D. cinerea ssp. nyassana, the latter which is typically larger and less hairy in its foliage.

It occurs in brushwood, thickets, hedges, teak forest and grassland and generally takes to poorer quality clay soils or deep and sandy soils with a wide pH range.

In India, it occurs in dry deciduous forest.

In southern Africa, Dichrostachys cinerea generally flowers from October to February with fruiting from May to September.

Uses

Fruit and seeds that grow on Dichrostachys cinerea are edible. Cattle, camels and game such as giraffe, buffalo, kudu, hartebeest, nyala, red forest duiker and Damara dik-dik feed on the juicy pods that fall to the ground. Such animals also feed on the immature twigs and leaves of the tree which are rich in protein (11–15%) and minerals. The flowers can be a valuable source of nectar for honey production. The wood is of a dense nature and burns slowly with no toxicity, so it is often used for fuelwood. The species yields a medium to heavy, durable hardwood and is often used in smaller domestic items as walking sticks, handles, spears and tool handles, particularly in central Africa.

Although there are currently limited to no evidence that can support these claims, the bark is used in traditional medicine for headache, toothache, dysentery, elephantiasis, root infusions are used for leprosy, syphilis, coughs, as an anthelmintic, purgative and strong diuretic, leaves are used for epilepsy  and also as a diuretic and laxative, and a powdered form is massaged on limbs with bone fractures. The roots are also sometimes used for bites or stings. In Siddha medicine of the Tamils in southern India, Dichrostachys cinerea is called vidathther and used for gonorrhea, syphilis and eczema.

As they are rich in nutrients, the plants are often used as fertiliser, particularly in the Sahel region of Africa along riverbanks. The plant is widely used for soil conservation, particularly in India, for shallow soils, and in arid western and subhumid alluvial plains.

It is also cultivated as an indoor bonsai specimen.

Despite its various uses, it is generally regarded a threat to agricultural production and is listed on the Global Invasive Species Database.

References

External links

cinerea
Flora of Africa
Flora of tropical Asia
Flora of Australia
Plants used in traditional African medicine